The Call of the Blood is a 1906 dramatic romance novel by the British writer Robert Hichens.

Adaptations
In 1920 it was turned into a French silent film The Call of the Blood directed by Louis Mercanton and starring Ivor Novello. A second adaptation Call of the Blood was released in 1948 and starred Kay Hammond and John Justin.

References

Bibliography
 Goble, Alan. The Complete Index to Literary Sources in Film. Walter de Gruyter, 1999.
 Vinson, James. Twentieth-Century Romance and Gothic Writers. Macmillan, 1982.

1906 British novels
Novels by Robert Hichens
British romance novels
British novels adapted into films